The Dornier Do 417 was a twin-engine multirole bomber.  Developed in 1942, it emerged from the Luftwaffe's request for a medium bomber, a contest for which Dornier, Junkers, Heinkel, and Blohm & Voss competed.  In the end, the Junkers Ju 188 was chosen as the aircraft, and the Do 417 never entered production.

Design and development 
The plans for the Do 417 were first presented to the RLM on January 22, 1943 in response to the Bomber B competition.  It was intended fill both the bomber and reconnaissance roles.  It was to have a stepless cockpit housing three of the four crew, and was to be fitted with Kuto-Nase cable-cutters on the nose and along the leading edge of the wing to defend against barrage balloons.  Dive brakes were to be positioned over and under the wings between the engine nacelles, similar to the Do 217.  The pilot's seat and tail gunner's positions were to be armored, and although unpressurized, the crew would have been able to operate at high altitude with oxygen masks.  The glazed nose and propellers would have had de-icers, and inflatable one-man dinghies would have been provided in case the aircraft ditched in the sea.

Defensive armament was originally to have consisted of an MG 151 cannon in the nose, an HD 151 turret in the dorsal position, and another HD 151 in the tail.  The nose-mounted MG 151 was later changed to a small turret, and an MG 131Z machine gun was added to the underside of the nose.  It would have been fitted with a Lotfernrohr 7D bombsight.  The internal bomb load was limited to fifteen 50 kg bombs, but provisions would be provided for two 2,000 kg bombs carried under the fuselage.  The aircraft was to be powered by two Daimler-Benz DB 603A inverted V12 engines, later changed to the DB 603G model.

The Do 417 V1 prototype was originally to be powered by two Junkers Jumo 222 engines, but problems with the powerplant led them to be substituted with the DB 603A-2.  However, the Do 417's performance was estimated to be worse than the competing Junkers Ju 188, and the Do 417 was rejected in favor of the Junkers aircraft before any prototypes were built.

Variants 
Do 417 V1
Unbuilt first prototype, to be powered by two DB 603A-2 engines.
Do 417A
Proposed production variant to be powered by two DB 603G engines.

Specifications (Do 417A)

See also

References 

 

1940s German bomber aircraft
Abandoned military aircraft projects of Germany
Dornier aircraft
Twin piston-engined tractor aircraft